Parkersburg Women's Club is a historic clubhouse located at Parkersburg, Wood County, West Virginia.  It was built between about 1860 and 1879, as a private home in the Italian Villa style.  It is a two-story, frame building with a very low-pitched hipped roof. It features a one-story wraparound porch. It has housed the Parkersburg Women's Club since 1921.

It was listed on the National Register of Historic Places in 1982, and it is a contributing property to the Avery Street Historic District, which was designated and listed on the National Register in 1986.

References

Houses on the National Register of Historic Places in West Virginia
Italianate architecture in West Virginia
Houses completed in 1888
Houses in Parkersburg, West Virginia
Women's club buildings
Women in West Virginia
Individually listed contributing properties to historic districts on the National Register in West Virginia
National Register of Historic Places in Wood County, West Virginia